Dreamkeeper is a 2003 film written by John Fusco and directed by Steve Barron. The main plot of the film is the conflict between a Lakota elder and storyteller named Pete Chasing Horse (August Schellenberg) and his Lakota grandson, Shane Chasing Horse (Eddie Spears).

The plot unwinds as the two travel from Pine Ridge Indian Reservation in South Dakota to the All Nations powwow in Albuquerque, New Mexico, a trip the grandson takes only under duress. Along the way, the grandfather tells his grandson various Indian stories and legends to help him understand and choose the "good red road," i.e. to embrace an Indian identity.

Plot
The film opens with Eagle Boy, a young man who is on a vision quest. It then cuts to the present, where a young cynical Lakota named Shane Chasing Horse is living on the Pine Ridge reservation. He is in trouble because he owes some money to a local gang—money he used to buy a beautiful ring for Mae Little Wounded, a girl he likes. Meanwhile, his mother asks him to drive his grandfather, Pete Chasing Horse, a storyteller, down to the powwow. Shane is reluctant. However, when the gang comes after him, Shane changes his mind and heads out to the powwow with his grandfather, who agrees to give him his truck once they reach the powwow. Grandfather tells Shane the story of a young Lakota man who tries to win the hand of Bluebird Woman. He also tells the story of how a thunder spirit falls in love with a Mohawk woman and brings her up into the ethereal world of Sky Woman, and of how she raised their son back in her village until he was struck by one of the villagers and brought back to live with his father.

Later, when a young redheaded man who is eager to learn about Native culture and hoping to be adopted by a Native American family asks to ride with them to the powwow, Shane says no. His grandfather then tells him the Kiowa story of Tehan, a white man who lived among the Kiowa and fought bravely alongside them, and Shane relents and lets the redhead ride with them. Shane's grandfather then tells how Eagle Boy follows the advice of a shining spirit elk, and seeks out an old woman who can give him weapons with which to slay the mighty serpent Uncegila. He is repulsed when the ugly old woman embraces him, but reacts quite differently when she transforms into a beautiful younger woman. She reproaches him, but gives him what he needs. Eagle Boy slays Uncegila, whose heart instructs him and grants him great power and prophetic visions.

Eventually, the gang members who are after Shane catch up with them, but accidentally drive their car off a cliff and into the Rio Grande River while chasing him. Shane dives in and saves them, and his struggle is contrasted with Eagle Boy's underwater battle with Uncegila. The gang members ride with them for a ways, until they and the redheaded hitchhiker leave them in order to travel with a group of attractive young Cheyenne women who are also headed to the powwow.

As they travel, Shane's grandfather tells Shane many other stories: several are about the trickster Coyote and Iktomi the spider. Another is about a young Pawnee man and his mother who are scorned by the rest of their tribe until the young man finds an unwanted dun pony who brings them good medicine. As Shane and his grandfather look up at the stars, the grandfather tells the story of the Quillwork Girl and her seven star brothers, which is about a Cheyenne girl who puts her faith in a dream and searches for seven brothers, but who must then contend with the Buffalo nation.  The next story is about a young Chinook woman who sacrifices herself in order to cure her village of a terrible sickness, and the next is about a young Blackfoot hunter who cannot let go of the memory of his father.

Shane and his grandfather continue their journey, losing their truck along the way and continuing on horseback and on foot. The two become closer. However, it then turns out that Shane's grandfather has led them not to the powwow but to Shane's father's (Sam Chasing Horse) trailer home. Shane is outraged and disappointed to be tricked, but is persuaded to stay the night. The next morning Shane finally makes peace with his estranged father. However, he then becomes grief-stricken when he discovers that his grandfather had meanwhile died in his sleep. Shane decides to continue on to the powwow on horseback, and his father says that when Shane comes home he'll be there too. The ending of Eagle Boy's story is revealed: Eagle Boy decides that he wants to live like other men, and disobeys the heart by revealing it to the entire tribe (to whom it appears to be nothing more than an ordinary stone).  At the powwow, Shane takes on the role of a storyteller, and children gather around him to listen.

Cast
 August Schellenberg as Grandpa Pete Chasing Horse 
 Eddie Spears as Shane Chasing Horse
 Gil Birmingham as Sam Chasing Horse
 Sheila Tousey as Janine
 Nathan Lee Chasing His Horse as Verdel 
 Chaske Spencer as Eagle Boy
 Gloria Eshkibok as Ugly Woman 
 Kimberly Norris Guerrero as Beautiful Woman
 Sean Wei Mah as High Horse
 Gordon Tootoosis as Kills Enemy
 Michael Greyeyes as Thunder Spirit  
 Alex Rice as She-Crosses-The Water
 Elizabeth Sage Galesi as Blue Bird Woman / Mae Little Wounded-credited as Sage
 Casey Camp-Horinek as Sky Woman
 Griffin Powell-Arcand as Thunder Boy
 Margo Kane as Clan Mother
 Scott Grimes as Red-Headed Stranger / Tehan
 Delanna Studi as Talks A Lot
 Nathaniel Arcand as Broken Lance
 Patric James Bird as Big Bow
 David McNally as The Colonel 
 Darren Lucas as Second Soldier
 Dave Leader as Young Soldier
 Clifford Crane Bear as Older Kiowa
 Kyle Daniels as Little Hand
 John Trudell as Coyote
 Gary Farmer as Iktome
 George Aguilar as Grandfather
 Geraldine Keams as Iktome's wife
 Dakota House as Dirty Belly
 Tantoo Cardinal as Old Woman 
 Floyd Red Crow Westerman as Iron Spoon
 Sheena Shymanski as Iron Spoon's daughter
 Teneil Whiskey Jack as Quillwork Girl
 Michelle Thrush as Morning Horse
 Terry Bigcharles as First Brother
 Simon R. Baker as Second Brother
 William Daniels as Third Brother
 Zachary Nolan Auger as Fourth Brother
 Sarain Waskawitch as Fifth Brother
 Cody Lightning as Sixth Brother
 Russell Badger as War Chief
 Cliff Soloman as Village Chief
 Misty Upham as Chief's daughter
 Lawrence Bayne as Raven
 Travis Dugas as Ekuskini
 Tyrone Tootoosis as Whirlwind Dreamer
 Sammy Simon as Ghost Hunter
 Stag Big Sorrel Horse as Hunter
 Jimmy Herman as Multnomah Elder
 Wilma Pelly as Old Woman
 Helmer Twoyoungmen as Salmon Hunter
 Tokala Clifford as Red Deer

Production
Filming lasted four months and took place mainly in Canada. Representatives of the Lakota, Kiowa, Cheyenne, Pawnee, Blackfeet, Mohawk and Crow tribes came on board the film to evaluate the authenticity of the production during filming and to suggest changes. One of the advisors was shocked to see that the crew had managed to get rare Cheyenne leopard dogs for one scene. Some scenes involved shooting a stampeding herd of 1,500 buffalo.

Visual effects supervisor Nicholas Brooks states that in order to create the heavenly, otherworldly look of the land of Sky Woman in the "Legend of She Crosses the Water and the Thunder Spirit," the filmmakers decided not to film the actors against blue screen. Instead, the color and texture of the scenes were later altered, sometimes in a rather arbitrary manner controlled by the computer, which Brooks says lent the sequence a particular psychological feel.

Awards
 2003, American Indian Film Festival: Best Film
 2004, Emmy Outstanding Special Visual Effects for a Miniseries, Movie or a Special
 2004 Humanitarian Award—John Fusco—First Americans in the Arts

References

External links
 
 "Dreamkeeper Keeps the Faith"—Reviews along with commentary by Rob Schmidt of Blue Corn Comics

2003 films
2003 drama films
American television films
Blackfoot in popular culture
Films about Native Americans
Sonar Entertainment films
Films directed by Steve Barron
Films with screenplays by John Fusco
Films scored by Stephen Warbeck
2000s English-language films